Ngāti Rārua are a Māori iwi (tribe) of the Tainui tribal confederation, descendants of the people who arrived in Aotearoa aboard the Tainui waka (canoe).

Ngāti Rārua stem from the marriage of Rārua-ioio and Tū-pāhau and had their original home at Kāwhia, Marokopa and Waikawau on the West Coast of the Waikato King Country region.

In 1821 Ngāti Rārua migrated southwards in a series of heke (migrations) led by Te Rauparaha of Ngāti Toa which saw the iwi relocate to Nelson Marlborough. Ngāti Rārua tribal lands (rohe) overlap those of Ngāti Koata, Ngāti Tama, Te Āti Awa, Ngāti Kuia, Ngāti Apa ki te Rā Tō and Rangitāne. Since the arrival in Te Tau Ihu, Ngāti Rārua have maintained continuous ahi kā in Golden Bay, various locations in the Abel Tasman National Park, Mārahau, Kaiteriteri, Riwaka, Motueka, Nelson, and Wairau.

Hapū

 Ngāti Tūrangāpeke
 Ngāti Pare-Te-Ata
 Ngāti Paretona
 Ngāti Kairārunga
 Te Arawāere

Marae

 Te Āwhina marae (Tūrangāpeke), Motueka
 Wairau Pā (Wairau), Blenheim
 Hauhunga Marae (Parerārua), Blenheim
 Whakatū Marae (Kākāti), Nelson
 Onetahua Marae (Te Ao Mārama), Takaka

See also
List of Māori iwi

External links
 Ngāti Rārua official website

 
Iwi and hapū